Autonomous learning may refer to:
Autonomous learning in homeschooling
Learner autonomy
Machine learning
Self-paced instruction